Holtet Nunatak is a nunatak rising to about ,  northeast of Grossenbacher Nunatak in the Lyon Nunataks of Palmer Land, Antarctica. It was mapped by the United States Geological Survey from aerial photographs taken by the U.S. Navy, 1965–68, and from Landsat imagery taken 1973–74. It was named in 1987 by the Advisory Committee on Antarctic Names after Jan A. Holtet of the Norwegian Institute of Cosmic Physics, an upper atmospheric physicist at Siple Station, 1970–71.

References

Nunataks of Palmer Land